Monique Gladding (born 17 June 1981 in Durban, South Africa) is a South African-born British diver. She competed for Great Britain in the 10 metre platform event at the 2012 Summer Olympics.

References

British female divers
Divers at the 2012 Summer Olympics
Olympic divers of Great Britain
1981 births
Living people